Kaliveli Lake, or Kaliveli Lagoon, is a coastal lake and lagoon with wetlands in the Viluppuram District of Tamil Nadu state, in eastern South India.

This lake is on the Coromandel Coast, near the Bay of Bengal.

Ecology
Kaliveli Lake is a seasonal wetland, with a gradient from freshwater to brackish water, and is an important feeding and breeding ground on migratory bird flyway. The lake is one of the largest wetlands in peninsular India, and is considered a wetland of both national and international importance by the IUCN.

It is currently threatened by encroachment from agricultural fields, wildlife poaching, loss of the surrounding forests, and increased commercial prawn farming.

Despite being one of the melting pot of southern Indian Coastal ecological site, this lake is hardly explored by nature lovers and environmental enthusiasts.  90% of the shores of this lake are not accessible through roads, which is also the main reason for its abundance of flora and fauna. One must take care of dangerous sinking peats and bogs while wading through these swamps. Also, these swamps are infested with mites and bugs that are carriers of most feared filariasis, malaria and other waterborne diseases. Hence the trekkers are advised to carry bugs repellant creams and thick boots. As this lake is always isolated and noticing another human is almost impossible in its 20 km vicinity, explorers are advised to carry sufficient food, water and other essential items.

History
The ruins of colonial Allamparwa Fort are located at the north channel's entrance point into Kaliveli Lagoon, on the Coromandel Coast.

See also
Environment of Tamil Nadu

Lakes of Tamil Nadu
Wetlands of India
Lagoons of India
Environment of Tamil Nadu
Coromandel Coast
Viluppuram district